Aelurodon is an extinct canid genus of the subfamily Borophaginae which lived from the Barstovian land mammal age of the middle Miocene to the late Miocene epoch.

Description
Aelurodon are a part of a clade of canids loosely known as "bone-crushing" or "hyena-like" dogs, that apparently descended from the earlier genera Protomarctus and Tomarctus. Several species are known from fossils found in the central and western U.S., suggesting a wide geographic range during their peak in the Miocene epoch. Large species of Aelurodon (A. ferox and A. taxoides) may have hunted in packs like modern wolves.

The evolution of Aelurodon is characterized by the progressive development of teeth adapted to a more hypercarnivorous diet, a trend consistent with other borophagines. The earliest occurrence of the genus is A. asthenostylus dating from 16. This species then gives rise to two different anagenetic clades around 15 Ma. One comprises the species A. montaneis, A. mcgrewi and A. stirtoni, going extinct around 12 Ma. The other clade persists until  and includes A. ferox and A. taxoides. A. taxoides is the most derived and largest species in Aelurodon.

References

Further reading
 Xiaoming Wang, Richard H. Tedford, Mauricio Antón, Dogs: Their Fossil Relatives and Evolutionary History, New York : Columbia University Press, 2008; 

Borophagines
Miocene canids
Prehistoric carnivoran genera
Miocene mammals of North America
Barstovian
Clarendonian
Hemphillian
Fossil taxa described in 1858